Ranam ( War) is a 2006 Indian Telugu-language action comedy film produced by Pokuri Babu Rao by on Eetharam Films banner and directed by Amma Rajasekhar. It stars Gopichand and Kamna Jethmalani and features music composed by Mani Sharma. The film is the debut of Amma Rajasekhar as a director. The film was remade into Oriya as Mahanayak and in Kannada as Bhadra.

Plot

Cast

Gopichand as Chinna
Kamna Jethmalani as Maheswari / Mahi
Biju Menon as Bhagawati
Chandra Mohan as Chinna's father
Ali as Gokul
Rama Prabha as Mahi's grandmother
Venu Madhav as Venu
Suman Setty as Student
Dharmavarapu Subramanyam as Principal
Pruthvi Raj as Inspector
Jeeva as Inspector
G. V. Sudhakar Naidu as Masthan
 Vajja Venkata Giridhar as Student
Amith as Student
Venu as Bhagawati's henchmen
Chitti as Chinna's brother
Tarzan as Gowri
Vijaya Singh as Chinna's mother
Jahnavi as Mahi's friend

Soundtrack

Music composed by Mani Sharma. Music released on ADITYA Music Company. All tracks recorded, mixed and mastered by SV Ranjit

Box Office performance
The film had a 100-day run in 24 centres.

References

External links 
 

2006 films
Indian action comedy films
Telugu films remade in other languages
Films scored by Mani Sharma
2000s Telugu-language films
2006 action films